The Korean National Semi-professional Football League was contested between South Korean works teams and military teams from 1964 to 2002. It was the predecessor of the Korea National League which was founded in 2003.

History
After the introduction of football from the UK navy in the late 19th century, football experienced a boom in Korea and many football clubs and school teams were formed in the 1910s.  There were also many corporate football clubs especially in Seoul and Pyongyang, two big cities in Korea. The corporate club division was made in All Joseon Football Tournament in Pyongyang in 1930, and Seoul Semi-professional Football League was founded in 1939, but both were stopped because of the Japanese government's policy during World War II. The Seoul League was reopened in 1949, but it was stopped again during the Korean War.

The National Semi-professional Football League was founded in 1964, which was the only football division in South Korea until 1982. It was held twice in a year as the spring league and the autumn league except the seasons from 1982 to 1984 when it was held as full-season. The match places were mostly in Seoul because many headquarters of corporation in Korea were in Seoul. The South Korean professional league, K League, was founded in 1983 that it made Semi-professional League as second division (but no promotion nor relegation). It remained until 2002 before Korea National League was officially founded in 2003.

Champions

List of champions

Titles by club

See also
 Korean National Football Championship
 Korean President's Cup
 Korean Semi-professional Football Championship
 Korea National League
 South Korean football league system
 List of South Korean football champions

References

External links
Results (1990–2002) at KFA (2013)
Results (1990–2002) at KFA (2007)

 
Defunct football competitions in South Korea